The Bayonne mosque shooting was an attack carried out on 28 October 2019. An 84-year-old man attacked a mosque in the southwestern French town of Bayonne. He seriously injured two people by gunfire. The police arrested the suspect. He is said to have taken part in the 2015 regional elections as a candidate for the far-right Front National (today the Rassemblement National).

According to the French police, the man is said to have tried to lay a kind of incendiary in front of the mosque at around 15:20 local time. He was disturbed by two men and then fired several shots at them. The two men were seriously injured. He then set fire to a car and fled. Police found a gas canister and a handgun in the car of the suspect.

Police later arrested the 84-year-old suspect, who was locally known as Claude Sinké at his home in Saint-Martin-de-Seignanx. He is also accused of trying to burn down the mosque.

Sinké died in prison on 26 February 2020, aged 84.

See also
 List of right-wing terrorist attacks
Bærum mosque shooting - a similar shooting in Norway, in which one person was wounded 
Christchurch mosque shootings - a mass shooting in New Zealand in which 51 people were killed

References   

2019 crimes in France
Anti-Muslim violence in Europe
Attacks on buildings and structures in 2019
Attacks on buildings and structures in France
Attacks on mosques
Non-fatal shootings
Mosque shooting
Crime in Nouvelle-Aquitaine
Right-wing terrorist incidents
Hate crimes in Europe
History of Nouvelle-Aquitaine
October 2019 crimes in Europe
October 2019 events in France
Failed terrorist attempts in France
Terrorist incidents in Europe in 2019